3800 Karayusuf, provisional designation , is a Mars-crossing asteroid and suspected binary system from inside the asteroid belt, approximately  in diameter. It was discovered on 4 January 1984, by American astronomer Eleanor Helin at the Palomar Observatory in California. The S/L-type asteroid has a short rotation period of 2.2 hours. It was named after Syrian physician Alford Karayusuf, a friend of the discoverer.

Orbit and classification 

Karayusuf is a Mars-crossing asteroid, a dynamically unstable group between the main-belt and the near-Earth populations, crossing the orbit of Mars at 1.66 AU. It orbits the Sun at a distance of 1.46–1.70 AU once every 2 years (724 days; semi-major axis of 1.58 AU). Its orbit has an eccentricity of 0.08 and an inclination of 15° with respect to the ecliptic. On 11 June 1938, Karayusuf passed  from Mars.

Naming 

This minor planet was named after Syrian physician Alford Karayusuf, a supporter of the Near-earth asteroid research projects at JPL and a leader of the World Space Foundation's program of Solar System exploration. The official naming citation was published by the Minor Planet Center on 2 November 1990. The main-belt asteroid 5255 Johnsophie, also discovered by Helin, was named after Alford Karayusuf's children, John and Sophie (also see the asteroid's ).

Physical characteristics 

In the SMASS classification, Karayusuf is a common, stony S-type asteroid. The asteroid has also been characterized as an L-type asteroid by the Sloan Digital Sky Survey and Pan-STARRS photometric survey.

Rotation period 

In March 2008, a rotational lightcurve of Karayusuf was obtained from photometric observations by Brian Warner at his Palmer Divide Observatory in Colorado. Lightcurve analysis gave a well-defined rotation period of  hours with a rather small brightness amplitude of 0.15 magnitude. The body's rotation is close to the threshold-period of that of a fast rotator, which would fly apart if they were not composed of a solid, monolithic structure.

Follow-up observations by Warner in 2010, 2014 and 2018 gave similar results. The asteroid was also observed by Brian Skiff (2.225 h) and William Ryan (2.23 h) in 2018.

Binary candidate 

During Brian Warner's photometric observations, two possible mutual eclipsing/occultation events were observed, indicating that  Karayusuf is a binary asteroid with a satellite in its orbit. The data, however, was insufficient to calculate a rotation period. In 2010 and in 2014, when observing conditions had a nearly identical phase angle, no evidence of an orbiting minor-planet moon was found. The results of the 2018-observation have not yet been published.

Diameter and albedo 

According to the survey carried out by the NEOWISE mission of NASA's Wide-field Infrared Survey Explorer, Karayusuf measures 2.51 kilometers in diameter and its surface has an albedo between 0.281, while other NEOWISE observations gave a diameter of 1.624 kilometers with a not very plausible albedo of 0.657. The Collaborative Asteroid Lightcurve Link assumes a standard albedo for a stony asteroid of 0.20 and calculates a diameter of 2.97 kilometers based on an absolute magnitude of 15.0.

Notes

References

External links 
 Asteroid Lightcurve Database (LCDB), query form (info )
 Dictionary of Minor Planet Names, Google books
 Discovery Circumstances: Numbered Minor Planets (1)-(5000) – Minor Planet Center
 
 

003800
Discoveries by Eleanor F. Helin
Named minor planets
003800
19840104